Sedgemoor is a low-lying area of land in Somerset, England. It lies close to sea level south of the Polden Hills, forming a large part of the Somerset Levels and Moors, a wetland area between the Mendips and the Blackdown Hills. The Neolithic people exploited the reed swamps for their natural resources and started to construct wooden trackways, including the world's oldest known timber trackway, the Post Track, dating to the 3800s BC. The Levels were the location of the Iron Age Glastonbury Lake Village as well as two lake villages at Meare Lake. Several settlements and hill forts were built on the natural "islands" of slightly raised land, including Brent Knoll and Glastonbury. In the Roman period sea salt was extracted and a string of settlements were set up along the Polden Hills.

A scheduled monument is a nationally important archaeological site or monument which is given legal protection by being placed on a list (or "schedule") by the Secretary of State for Culture, Media and Sport; English Heritage takes the leading role in identifying such sites. The legislation governing this is the Ancient Monuments and Archaeological Areas Act 1979. The term "monument" can apply to the whole range of archaeological sites, and they are not always visible above ground. Such sites have to have been deliberately constructed by human activity. They range from prehistoric standing stones and burial sites, through Roman remains and medieval structures such as castles and monasteries, to later structures such as industrial sites and buildings constructed for the World Wars or the Cold War.

There are 79 scheduled monuments in Sedgemoor. The oldest are Neolithic, Bronze Age or Iron Age including hill forts, bowl barrows and occupied caves including several in Cheddar Gorge. Cannington Camp (which is also known as Cynwit Castle) dates from the Bronze Age, while Brent Knoll Camp between the Somerset Levels and Brean Down is Iron Age (although there are some Bronze Age artefacts) and it was reused in the Roman period. The Romano-British period is represented with several sites. Medieval sites include several motte-and-bailey castles and church or village crosses. Industrial development, particularly in Bridgwater, are represented by brick and tile kilns and a telescopic railway bridge. The most recent monuments are World War II bunkers and bombing decoys on Black Down. The monuments are listed below using the titles given in the English Heritage data sheets.

Monuments

|}

See also
 Scheduled Monuments in Somerset
 Grade I listed buildings in Sedgemoor
 Grade II* listed buildings in Sedgemoor

Notes

References

List
List
History of Somerset
Sedgemoor
Lists of buildings and structures in Somerset